Les Mazures is a commune in the Ardennes department in northern France.

During the Second World War, Les Mazures was the site of a minor concentration camp, used by the Nazis for the detainment of Jews.

Population

See also
Communes of the Ardennes department

References

Communes of Ardennes (department)
Ardennes communes articles needing translation from French Wikipedia